Brownstown is an unincorporated community in Crawford County, Indiana, in the United States.

History
When Brownstown contained a post office, it was called Mount Prospect. That post office operated from 1835 until 1918.

References

Unincorporated communities in Crawford County, Indiana
Unincorporated communities in Indiana